Walter McNutt (born November 8, 1940) is an American politician who was a Republican member of the Montana House of Representatives from 2005 until 2012.  He was elected to House District 37 which represents the Sidney, Montana area. McNutt also served in the Senate from 1997 to 2004.

References

Living people
1940 births
University of Providence alumni
Republican Party members of the Montana House of Representatives
Republican Party Montana state senators
People from Sidney, Montana